Barnum Museum is a museum in Bridgeport, Connecticut, USA, with a collection related to P. T. Barnum.

Barnum Museum may also refer to:

 Barnum's American Museum, a defunct New York City museum co-owned by Barnum, founded 1841 and destroyed by fire in 1865
 Barnum's New Museum, another defunct New York City museum, opened by Barnum in 1865 and destroyed by fire in 1868
 Barnum Museum of Natural History, a defunct museum at Tufts University, notable for displaying the hide of Jumbo the Elephant
 The Barnum Museum, a 1990 collection of fantasy themed short stories by Steven Millhauser